St Margaret's Church is in Main Street, Hornby, Lancashire, England. The church is recorded in the National Heritage List for England as a designated Grade I listed building. It is an active Anglican parish church in the diocese of Blackburn, the archdeaconry of Lancaster and the deanery of Tunstall. Its benefice is combined with those of St Michael, Whittington, St John, Arkholme, and St John, Gressingham.

History

A church was on the site in 1338.

The oldest part of the current church is the tower, which was built by Sir Edward Stanley, Lord Mounteagle, in 1514. Lord Mounteagle also arranged for the rebuilding of the chancel but this was incomplete when he died in 1524.

In 1817 the old nave was demolished and replaced by a new nave. In 1888–89 a Victorian restoration was carried out by the Lancaster architects Paley, Austin and Paley. The nave was largely rebuilt, arcades and a clerestory were inserted, the church was reroofed and refloored, the west gallery was removed, the box pews were replaced by modern seating, the vestry was converted into an organ chamber, and a new vestry was built; this was done at an estimated cost of £3,000.

A stained glass window from 1908 commemorates St Cecilia, gifted by survivors of William Henry Foster, as inscribed in the dedication. Unusually, it shows lady's slipper orchids (Cypripedium calceolus) at her feet.

Architecture

Exterior

The church is built in sandstone ashlar and its plan consists of a west tower, a nave and chancel under a continuous roof with a clearstory, and north and south aisles. The tower has three stages and is octagonal with the two upper stages being set diagonally to the base. Its parapet is embattled with pinnacles. The middle stage has a clock and a plaque carved with the Mounteagle arms. The nave and aisles have embattled parapets. At the east end is a semi-octagonal apse.

Interior
In the church is a monument to Dr Lingard, the Roman Catholic priest from St Mary's Church, Hornby, who died in 1851. Also in the church are two fragments of Anglo-Saxon crosses. The organ was built by Abbott and Smith and moved to St Margaret's from Hornby Castle in 1899. It was renovated by Ainscough around 1950 and restored by Harrison & Harrison in 1986. There is a ring of eight bells. Six of these were cast by Abel Rudhall in 1761 and the other two by Mears and Stainbank of the Whitechapel Bell Foundry in 1922. The parish register of baptisms begins in 1742 and that of burials in 1763.

External features

In the churchyard is a sandstone Anglo-Saxon cross base which is listed at Grade II*. The churchyard also contains the war grave of a Manchester Regiment officer of World War II.

See also

Grade I listed churches in Lancashire
Grade I listed buildings in Lancashire
Listed buildings in Hornby-with-Farleton
List of works by Paley, Austin and Paley

References

Churches completed in 1514
Churches completed in 1817
Churches completed in 1889
Hornby, Saint Margaret's Church
Hornby, Saint Margaret's Church
English Gothic architecture in Lancashire
Gothic Revival architecture in Lancashire
Hornby, Saint Margaret's Church
Churches in the City of Lancaster
19th-century Church of England church buildings
Paley, Austin and Paley buildings